WNXY-LD, virtual channel 43 (VHF digital channel 10), is a low-power Diya TV-affiliated television station licensed to New York, New York, United States. The station is owned by New York Spectrum Holding Company.

History

As W54AY and WNXY-LP
WNXY-LP first signed on in 1988 over channel 54 as W54AY, which was licensed in the Brownsville area of Brooklyn, New York. One program that aired in the 1980s was Rapid T. Rabbit and Friends, which also aired on W44AI (now WNYX-LD) for a short time before moving to cable months later.

In 1998, it changed its call letters to WNXY-LP and moved to channel 27. Like its sister station WNYX-LD, this station broadcast community access-type programming. Much of its programming generally appealed to various ethnic audiences. In 2000, the station moved to channel 26 due to WTBY-TV being assigned channel 27 for its Digital Television service. In 2006, WNXY-LP was granted the right to flash cut to channel 43 after the digital transition, due to predicted interference with KYW-TV in Philadelphia, which broadcasts on digital channel 26. In the summer of 2007, WNXY-LP left the air when Metro Studios moved to Times Square. In late 2007, it returned to the air as a translator station of WNYX. In April 2009, WNXY once again suspended operations and went silent.

As WNXY-LD

It did obtain a Special Temporary Authority to remain silent, pending the build-out of its Construction Permit for digital channel 43. As of March 10, 2011, it returned to the air on virtual channel 43.1, with a test pattern. Around 2012, Island Broadcasting sold WNXY to NY Spectrum Holding. The station returned on the air in October 2013, simulcasting co-owned WNYX-LD and WXNY-LD. In 2019 the station switched to religious network Good TV while WXNY switched back to CGTN America which has switched to COMFY TV in 2022. In 2020 WNXY switches to Diya TV.

Subchannels

External links

Low-power television stations in the United States
Television channels and stations established in 1989
NXY-LD
1989 establishments in New York (state)
Diya TV affiliates